David Azéma (born 22 November 1960) is a French businessman, and a former chairman and chief executive of Eurostar from 1999 to 2002; he worked with the French government's Agence des participations de l'État, and is chairman of Global Infrastructure Group at Bank of America.

Early life
He was born and brought up in Paris. His parents were both university professors. In his teenage years he thought about becoming a film director.

He attended Lycée Henri-IV in Paris. From the University of Paris he gained a degree in law. He later studied Politics at Sciences Po. He then trained at the École nationale d'administration (ENA) in Strasbourg, leaving in 1987.

Career
In 1993 he joined the economics department of SNCF.

Eurostar
He joined Eurostar in March 1999. He became chairman of Eurostar in October 1999, aged 38. The company had been restructured. Eurostar had 31 trains, each costing £24m; they could run on three different electrical power systems and four different signalling systems. At the time, Eurostar had 65% of the London-Paris market.

He resigned from Eurostar Group on 12 June 2002. He was replaced on 4 July 2002 by the current Eurostar chairman Guillaume Pepy, who in 2008 became Chief Executive of SNCF.

References

External links
 Biography

1960 births
Living people
People from Neuilly-sur-Seine
Lycée Henri-IV alumni
Sciences Po alumni
École nationale d'administration alumni
French businesspeople
French rail transport chief executives
Judges of the Court of Audit (France)